The blood-vomiting game is a famous game of Go of the Edo period of Japan, played on June 27, 1835, between Hon'inbō Jōwa (white) and Akaboshi Intetsu (black). It is noted for the three ghost moves that were allegedly given to Jōwa during the game by ghosts, and for the premature death of the go prodigy Akaboshi Intetsu who died soon after coughing up blood onto the board after the game. Selected moves of the game are shown in diagrams.

After continually struggling to gain the post of Meijin, Hon'inbō Jōwa had won the title over rival Inoue Gennan Inseki. The rivalry between Jōwa and Inseki began when a game scheduled between the two was cancelled. The game, scheduled for February 18, 1828, was to be played due to Inseki's recent promotion to 8 dan. The game was cancelled by Jōwa's side, who claimed that Inseki did not deserve his promotion but had gained it through intrigue. This led Inseki to attempt to remove Jōwa from his post. Failing to keep to an agreement, Jōwa refused to give up his post to Inseki after six years (1834). Inseki then sent his pupil, Akaboshi Intetsu, expected to become Meijin after Jōwa, to play Jōwa in a match. The match lasted for four days without any adjournments. Jōwa won the match, and while kneeling over the board Akaboshi coughed or vomited up blood. He died within a few months. As Akaboshi was only 25 years old at the time, it is often suggested that pre-existing gastrointestinal bleeding or pulmonary disease had weakened his health, and it is possible that Akaboshi was sick for months with these diseases already.

The game

The secret Inoue house move
The secret move used by Akaboshi in the match was developed by Gennan Inseki and others in the Inoue house as a taisha variation. The move, shown in the diagram, gave Akaboshi a lead by attacking the white stones in the center and being able to capture two stones later on in the game.

The ghost moves
The three ghost moves were believed to have been brought to Jōwa by ghosts, allowing him to come back in a game he was losing. These moves eventually led to Jōwa winning by resignation. 

The first two ghost moves, white 2 and 4 in the diagram below, allowed white to ignore black's move at 1 in order to play another move at 6 due to the aji of "a".

The third ghost move was an example of bad shape but good move. Although forming an empty triangle shape is normally avoided because it is inefficient, the move allowed Jowa to launch a splitting attack that would lead to his victory.

End of the game

Notes

External links
Sensei's Library article on the "Blood Vomiting Game"
 Move-by-move play (10 minutes).
3D visualization of Blood-vomiting game

Go games
1835 in Japan
1835 in go
June 1835 sports events